The Other Half was a dating game show on BBC One, which ran from 7 June 1997 to 2 February 2002. It was hosted by Dale Winton.

Transmissions

References

External links

BBC television game shows
1990s British game shows
2000s British game shows
1997 British television series debuts
2002 British television series endings
English-language television shows